Emotional Traffic is the eleventh studio album by American country music artist Tim McGraw. Originally completed in late 2010, it is McGraw's last studio album released by Curb Records, a label he has been with since his self-titled 1993 debut album. It was released on January 24, 2012.

Background

Emotional Traffic was originally completed in late 2010, but was held by Curb Records. In an interview with "The Boot", McGraw expressed his frustration with the label saying "All the songs have been done for a long time, and the label has had it; It's the last album that they have of mine, so they're trying to hold on to it as long as they can." On May 13, 2011, Curb Records filed a breach-of-contract suit against McGraw, alleging that McGraw recorded tracks for the album too early prior to its delivery to the label.

Several days later, McGraw filed a counter suit against the label seeking advance payment and recording-fund reimbursement, unspecified damages, and a jury trial, which began in July 2012.

NPR featured Emotional Traffic in its website's First Listen series, streaming the album in its entirety beginning January 16, 2012.

Track listing

Personnel 
Compiled from liner notes.

Musicians

 Tony Harrell – Wurlitzer electric piano (1, 3, 5, 10), acoustic piano (4, 8, 9) synthesizers (8)
 Rami Jaffee – Hammond B3 organ (1, 3, 4, 5, 8, 9, 10)
 Jamie Muhoberac – synthesizers (1-5, 7-12), Hammond B3 organ (2), acoustic piano (8, 9), Wurlitzer electric piano (9)
 Steve Nathan – synthesizers (2, 12), acoustic piano (6), Hammond B3 organ (6, 7, 12), Wurlitzer electric piano (7)
 Jeff McMahon – Hammond B3 organ (11), synthesizers (11)
 Rusty Anderson – electric guitar (1, 4, 5, 8, 9, 10), acoustic guitar (3, 8)
 Dan Dugmore – acoustic guitar (1, 4, 9, 10),  steel guitar (1, 2, 3, 5-8, 12)
 Dave Levita – electric guitar (1, 3, 4, 5, 8, 9, 10), acoustic guitar (8)
 Troy Lancaster – electric guitar (2, 6, 7, 12)
 Jerry McPherson – electric guitar (2, 6-9, 11, 12)
 Bryan Sutton – acoustic guitar (2, 6, 7, 12)
 Byron Gallimore – electric guitar (4, 8, 9, 11), 12-string guitar (11)
 Jay Joyce – electric guitar (9)
 Denny Henningson – electric guitar (11)
 Bob Minner – acoustic guitar (11)
 Darran Smith – electric guitar (11)
 Deano Brown – mandolin (11)
 Paul Bushnell – bass (1-10, 12)
 John Marcus – bass (11)
 Abe Laboriel Jr. – drums (1, 3, 4, 5, 8, 9, 10), percussion (3, 10)
 Shannon Forrest – drums (2, 6, 7, 12), percussion (2, 12)
 Billy Mason – drums (11)
 David Dunkley – congas (11), percussion (11)

Background vocals
 Tim McGraw – lead vocals (all tracks), backing vocals (10)
 Greg Barnhill (1, 2, 4, 5, 7, 8, 9, 12)
 Perry Coleman (2, 7, 9, 12)
 Faith Hill (3)
 Angie Aparo (5)
 Wes Hightower (6)
 Byron Gallimore (9)
 Jim Beavers (10)
 The Warren Brothers (10)
 Ne-Yo (11)

Production
 Byron Gallimore – producer, mixing
 Tim McGraw – producer
 Darran Smith – producer (11)
 Missi Gallimore – A&R direction
 Julian King – engineer
 Sara Lesher – additional recording, Pro Tools engineer
 Erik Lutkins – additional recording, Pro Tools engineer 
 David Bryant – assistant engineer 
 Lowell Reynolds – assistant engineer (1, 3, 4, 5, 8, 10)
 Colin Heldt – assistant engineer (11)
 Jason Hall – guitar overdub engineer (9)
 Christian Baker – vocal recording (11)
 Adam Ayan – mastering
 Glenn Sweitzer – art direction, design 
 Danny Clinch – photography

Studios
 Recorded at Dark Horse Recording Studio (Franklin, TN); Blackbird Studios and Ocean Way (Nashville, TN)
 Ne-Yo's vocals recorded at Germano Studios (New York City, NY).
 Edited, overdubbed and mixed at Essential Sound Studios (Houston, TX).
 Mastered at Gateway Mastering (Portland, ME).

Chart performance

Weekly charts

Year-end charts

Singles

References

External links
 

2012 albums
Tim McGraw albums
Curb Records albums
Albums produced by Byron Gallimore
Albums produced by Tim McGraw